The following is a list of amphibians of Bhutan from Wangyal (2013, 2014). In Bhutan, Hoplobatrachus tigerinus is widely consumed by people. Nanorana annandalii and Nanorana blanfordii are consumed by the residents of Sakteng, Trashigang District.

List

Frogs
Family Bufonidae
Duttaphrynus melanostictus
Duttaphrynus cf. stuarti
Duttaphrynus himalayanus

Family Dicroglossidae
Euphlyctis cyanophlyctis
Fejervarya cf. limnocharis
Fejervarya nepalensis
Fejervarya pierrei
Fejervarya teraiensis
Hoplobatrachus crassus
Hoplobatrachus tigerinus
Nanorana annandalii
Nanorana arnoldi
Nanorana conaensis
Nanorana liebigii
Nanorana blanfordii
Nanorana parkeri
Nanorana pleskei
Nanorana vicina
Nanorana sp.
Ombrana sikimensis
Occidozyga borealis

Family Megophryidae
Xenophrys cf. nankiangensis
Scutiger bhutanensis — endemic
Scutiger boulengeri
Scutiger sikimmensis
Xenophrys parva
Xenophrys glandulosa
Xenophrys major
Xenophrys minor

Family Microhylidae
Microhyla ornata

Family Ranidae
Hyla cf. annectans
Amolops formosus
Amolops gerbillus
Amolops himalayanus
Amolops marmoratus
Amolops cf. monticola
Clinotarsus alticola
Rana (Sylvirana) sp.
Hylarana sp.
Humerana humeralis
Lithobates catesbeianus — dubious
Amolops mantzorum
Hylarana nigrovittata
Hylarana taipehensis
Hylarana tytleri
Sylvirana leptoglossa
Sylvirana cf. guentheri

Family Rhacophoridae
Polypedates cf. himalayensis
Polypedates maculatus
Rhacophorus maximus
Rhacophorus tuberculatus
Theloderma andersoni
Theloderma asperum

Salamanders
Family Salamandridae
Tylototriton verrucosus

Caecilians
Family Ichthyophiidae
Ichthyophis sikkimensis

References

Wangyal, Jigme Tshelthrim. 2013. Status of Amphibian Studies and Conservation in Bhutan.
Wangyal, Jigme Tshelthrim. 2014. The status of Herpetofauna of Bhutan. Journal of the Bhutan Ecological Society, Issue 1.

See also
List of amphibians of Sikkim
List of amphibians of Northeast India
List of amphibians of India

 List
Amph
Bhutan
Bhutan